German submarine U-1053 was a Type VIIC U-boat of Nazi Germany's Kriegsmarine during World War II.

Construction 
The U-1053 was laid down on 8 February 1943 at the Germaniawerft yard in Kiel, Germany. She was launched on 13 January 1944 and commissioned on 12 February 1944 under the command of Oberleutnant zur See Helmut Lange. Her U-boat emblem was Crossed Swords.

She was assessed at  submerged. She had two shafts and two  propellers.

The submarine was fitted with five  torpedo tubes (four fitted at the bow and one at the stern), fourteen torpedoes, one  deck gun (220 rounds), one  Flak M42 and two twin  C/30 anti-aircraft guns. The boat had a complement of 44 to 57 men.

Service history
U-1053 was used as a Training ship in the 5th U-boat Flotilla from 12 February 1944 until 31 October 1944 before serving in the 11th U-boat Flotilla for active service on 1 November 1944. The submarine was fitted with a Schnorchel underwater-breathing apparatus in March 1944.

During her active service, U-1053 made one patrol. She left Horten on 7 November 1944 and patrolled a large part of the Atlantic Ocean before arriving at Stavanger on 21 January 1945 after a patrol of 76 days. In total U-1053 spend 81 days at sea.

Sinking 
The U-1053 left Bergen, Norway on 15 February 1945 and arrived the same day in the North Sea in the Byfjord, northwest of Bergen. She was there on a diving trial, after an overhaul in the naval yard at Bergen, the submarine was forced to carry out her diving trials in the Byfjord. There were 38 crew members on board including the commander and seven Norwegian engineers and foremen from the naval yard.

The U-1053 dived normally, but after this first dive there must have been an accident aboard. When the submarine surfaced, her bow suddenly stuck up into the air at a steep angle and the submarine sank quickly in the sea stern first. Other boats came to the scene and even heard knocking from the inside of the submarine from the trapped crew. The submarine sank to a depth of  taken all 45 crew, engineers and foremen with her. The accident was probably a result of an operational error at the Snorkel facility, but sabotage couldn't be ruled out.

Wreck 
The wreck is broken up into several pieces which indicates that the submarine hit the sea floor at a high speed.

References

Bibliography

German Type VIIC submarines
U-boats commissioned in 1944
World War II submarines of Germany
Ships built in Kiel
1944 ships
Maritime incidents in February 1945
Shipwrecks in the North Sea
Ships lost with all hands